This is a List of Sheffield Wednesday F.C. managers. Their first and longest serving manager was Arthur Dickinson who was appointed in 1891. There have been a total of 31 managers appointed to the role on a permanent basis and a further four have taken the position in a caretaker role. The vast majority have been English and until 2015 the club had not hired a manager from outside of the United Kingdom. Many of the managerial changes have taken place in recent years including eight different managers between 1995 and 2004.

Arthur Dickinson is also the club's most successful manager so far, winning two  First Division titles (1902–03 and 1903–04) and the same number of FA Cups (1896 and 1907). Robert Brown was in charge during Wednesday's two other league championship successes in 1928–29 and 1929–30. The last FA Cup was won during Billy Walker's reign at the end of the 1935 season. Ron Atkinson masterminded the club's only League Cup triumph in 1991. His successor, Trevor Francis, took the club to third place in Football's top tier in the 1991–92 season, before he became the only manager to lose both the FA Cup and League Cup finals in the same year in 1993.

Key
All first-team matches in national competition are counted, except the abandoned 1939–40 Football League season and matches in wartime leagues and cups.
P = matches played; W = matches won; D = matches drawn; L = matches lost; Win % = win percentage (rounded to two decimal places)
Statistics are complete up to and including the match played on 1 March 2021.

Managers

References

Managers
 
Sheffield Wednesday F.C.